The following is a timeline of the COVID-19 pandemic in Nigeria from July to December 2020.

Timeline

July

1 July – 790 cases and 13 deaths reported, bringing the total number of confirmed cases and deaths to 26,484 and 603, respectively.

2 July – 626 cases and 13 deaths reported, bringing the total number of confirmed cases and deaths to 27,110 and 616, respectively.

3 July – 454 cases and 12 deaths reported, bringing the total number of confirmed cases and deaths to 27,564 and 628, respectively.

4 July – 603 cases and 6 deaths reported, bringing the total number of confirmed cases and deaths to 28,167 and 634, respectively.

5 July – 603 cases reported and 11 deaths reported, bringing the total number of confirmed cases and deaths to 28,711 and 645, respectively.

6 July – 575 cases reported and 9 deaths reported, bringing the total number of confirmed cases and deaths to 29,286 and 654, respectively.

7 July – 503 cases reported and 15 deaths reported, bringing the total number of confirmed cases and deaths to 29,789 and 669, respectively.

8 July – 460 cases reported and 15 deaths reported, bringing the total number of confirmed cases and deaths to 30,249 and 684, respectively.

9 July – 499 cases reported and 5 deaths reported, bringing the total number of confirmed cases and deaths to 30,748 and 689, respectively.

10 July – 575 cases reported and 20 deaths reported, bringing the total number of confirmed cases and deaths to 31,323 and 709, respectively.

11 July – 664 cases and 15 deaths reported, bringing the total number of confirmed cases and deaths to 31,987 and 724, respectively.

12 July – 571 cases and 16 deaths reported, bringing the total number of confirmed cases and deaths to 32,558 and 740, respectively.

13 July – 595 cases and 4 deaths reported, bringing the total number of confirmed cases and deaths to 33,153 and 744, respectively.

14 July – 463 cases and 10 deaths reported, bringing the total number of confirmed cases and deaths to 33,616 and 754, respectively.

15 July – 643 cases and 6 deaths reported, bringing the total number of confirmed cases and deaths to 34,259 and 760, respectively.

16 July – 595 cases and 9 deaths reported, bringing the total number of confirmed cases and deaths to 34,854 and 769, respectively.

17 July – 600 cases and 13 deaths reported, bringing the total number of confirmed cases and deaths to 35,454 and 772, respectively.

18 July – 653 cases and 6 deaths reported, bringing the total number of confirmed cases and deaths to 36,107 and 778, respectively.

19 July – 556 cases and 11 deaths reported, bringing the total number of confirmed cases and deaths to 36,663 and 789, respectively.

20 July – 562 cases and 12 deaths reported, bringing the total number of confirmed cases and deaths to 37,225 and 801, respectively.

21 July – 576 cases and 4 deaths reported, bringing the total number of confirmed cases and deaths to 37,801 and 805, respectively.

22 July – 543 cases and 8 deaths reported, bringing the total number of confirmed cases and deaths to 38,344 and 813, respectively.

23 July – 604 cases and 20 deaths reported, bringing the total number of confirmed cases and deaths to 38,948 and 833, respectively.

24 July – 591 cases and 12 deaths reported, bringing the total number of confirmed cases and deaths to 39,539 and 845, respectively.

25 July – 438 cases and 11 deaths reported, bringing the total number of confirmed cases and deaths to 39,977 and 856, respectively.

26 July – 555 cases and 2 deaths reported, bringing the total number of confirmed cases and deaths to 40,532 and 858, respectively.

27 July – 648 cases and 2 deaths reported, bringing the total number of confirmed cases and deaths to 41,180 and 860, respectively.

28 July – 624 cases and 8 deaths reported, bringing the total number of confirmed cases and deaths to 41,804 and 868, respectively.

29 July – 404 cases and 5 deaths reported, bringing the total number of confirmed cases and deaths to 42,208 and 873, respectively.

30 July – 481 cases and 5 deaths reported, bringing the total number of confirmed cases and deaths to 42,689 and 878, respectively.

31 July – 462 cases and 1 death reported, bringing the total number of confirmed cases and deaths to 43,151 and 879, respectively.

August

1 August – 386 cases and 4 deaths reported, bringing the total number of confirmed cases and deaths to 43,537 and 883, respectively.

2 August – 304 cases and 5 deaths reported, bringing the total number of confirmed cases and deaths to 43,841 and 888, respectively.

3 August – 288 cases and 8 deaths reported, bringing the total number of confirmed cases and deaths to 44,129 and 896, respectively.

4 August – 304 cases and 14 deaths reported, bringing the total number of confirmed cases and deaths to 44,433 and 910, respectively.

5 August – 457 cases and 17 deaths reported, bringing the total number of confirmed cases and deaths to 44,890 and 927, respectively.

6 August – 354 cases and 3 deaths reported, bringing the total number of confirmed cases and deaths to 45,244 and 930, respectively.

7 August – 443 cases and 6 deaths reported, bringing the total number of confirmed cases and deaths to 45,687 and 936, respectively.

8 August – 453 cases and 6 deaths reported, bringing the total number of confirmed cases and deaths to 46,140 and 942, respectively.

9 August – 437 cases and 3 deaths reported, bringing the total number of confirmed cases and deaths to 46,577 and 945, respectively.

10 August – 290 cases and 5 deaths reported, bringing the total number of confirmed cases and deaths to 46,867 and 950, respectively.

11 August – 423 cases and 6 deaths reported, bringing the total number of confirmed cases and deaths to 47,290 and 956, respectively.

12 August – 453 cases and no deaths reported, bringing the total number of confirmed cases to 47,743.

13 August – 373 cases and 10 deaths reported, bringing the total number of confirmed cases and deaths to 48,116 and 966, respectively.

14 August – 329 cases and 7 deaths reported, bringing the total number of confirmed cases and deaths to 48,445 and 973, respectively.

15 August – 325 cases and 1 death reported, bringing the total number of confirmed cases and deaths to 48,770 and 974, respectively.

16 August – 298 cases and 1 death reported, bringing the total number of confirmed cases and deaths to 49,068 and 975, respectively.

17 August – 417 cases and 2 deaths reported, bringing the total number of confirmed cases and deaths to 49,485 and 977, respectively.

18 August – 410 cases and 4 deaths reported, bringing the total number of confirmed cases and deaths to 49,895 and 981, respectively.

19 August – 593 cases and 4 deaths reported, bringing the total number of confirmed cases and deaths to 50,488 and 985, respectively.

20 August – 476 cases and 7 deaths reported, bringing the total number of confirmed cases and deaths to 50,964 and 992, respectively.

21 August – 340 cases and 4 deaths reported, bringing the total number of confirmed cases and deaths to 51,304 and 996, respectively.

22 August, 601 cases and 1 death reported, bringing the total number of confirmed cases and deaths to 51,905 and 997, respectively.

23 August – 322 cases and 5 deaths reported, bringing the total number of confirmed cases and deaths to 52,227 and 1,002, respectively.

24 August – 321 cases and 2 deaths reported, bringing the total number of confirmed cases and deaths to 52,548 and 1,004, respectively.

25 August – 252 cases and 3 deaths reported, bringing the total number of confirmed cases and deaths to 52,800 and 1,007, respectively.

26 August – 221 cases and 3 deaths reported, bringing the total number of confirmed cases and deaths to 53,021 and 1,010, respectively.

27 August – 296 cases and 1 death reported, bringing the total number of confirmed cases and deaths to 53,317 and 1,011, respectively.

28 August – 160 cases and no deaths reported, bringing the total number of confirmed cases to 53,477.

29 August – 250 cases and no deaths reported, bringing the total number of confirmed cases to 53,727.

30 August – 138 cases and 2 deaths reported, bringing the total number of confirmed cases and deaths to 53,865 and 1,013, respectively.

31 August – 143 cases and no deaths reported, bringing the total number of confirmed cases to 54,008.

September

1 September – 239 cases and 10 deaths reported, bringing the total number of confirmed cases and deaths to 54,247 and 1,023, respectively.

2 September – 216 cases and 4 deaths reported, bringing the total number of confirmed cases and deaths to 54,463 and 1,027, respectively.

3 September – 125 cases and 21 deaths reported, bringing the total number of confirmed cases and deaths to 54,588 and 1,048, respectively.

4 September – 156 cases and 3 deaths reported, bringing the total number of confirmed cases and deaths to 54,743 and 1,051, respectively.

5 September – 162 cases and 3 deaths reported, bringing the total number of confirmed cases and deaths to 54,905 and 1,054, respectively.

6 September – 100 cases and 3 deaths reported, bringing the total number of confirmed cases and deaths to 55,005 and 1,057, respectively.

7 September – 155 cases and 4 deaths reported, bringing the total number of confirmed cases and deaths to 55,160 and 1,061, respectively.

8 September – 296 cases and 6 deaths reported, bringing the total number of confirmed cases and deaths to 55,456 and 1,067, respectively.

9 September – 176 cases and 3 deaths reported, bringing the total number of confirmed cases and deaths to 55,632 and 1,070, respectively.

10 September – 197 cases and 5 deaths reported, bringing the total number of confirmed cases and deaths to 55,829 and 1,075, respectively.

11 September – 188 cases and 1 death reported, bringing the total number of confirmed cases and deaths to 56,017 and 1,076, respectively.

12 September – 160 cases and 2 deaths reported, bringing the total number of confirmed cases and deaths to 56,177 and 1,078, respectively.

13 September – 79 cases and 4 deaths reported, bringing the total number of confirmed cases and deaths to 56,256 and 1,082, respectively.

14 September – 132 cases and 1 death reported, bringing the total number of confirmed cases and deaths to 56,388 and 1,083, respectively.

15 September – 90 cases and 5 deaths reported, bringing the total number of confirmed cases and deaths to 56,478 and 1,088, respectively.

16 September – 126 cases and 3 deaths reported, bringing the total number of confirmed cases and deaths to 56,604 and 1,091, respectively.

17 September – 131 cases and 2 deaths reported, bringing the total number of confirmed cases and deaths to 56,735 and 1,093, respectively.

18 September – 221 cases and 1 death reported, bringing the total number of confirmed cases and deaths to 56,956 and 1,094, respectively.

19 September – 189 cases and 1 death reported, bringing the total number of confirmed cases and deaths to 57,145 and 1,095, respectively.

20 September – 97 cases and 3 deaths reported, bringing the total number of confirmed cases and deaths to 57,242 and 1,098, respectively.

21 September – 195 cases and 2 deaths reported, bringing the total number of confirmed cases and deaths to 57,437 and 1,100, respectively.

22 September – 176 cases and 0 deaths reported, bringing the total number of confirmed cases to 57,613.

23 September – 111 cases and 2 deaths reported, bringing the total number of confirmed cases and deaths to 57,724 and 1,102, respectively.

24 September – 125 cases and 0 deaths reported, bringing the total number of confirmed cases to 57,849.

25 September – 213 cases and 1 death reported, bringing the total number of confirmed cases and deaths to 58,062 and 1,103, respectively.

26 September – 136 cases and 3 deaths reported, bringing the total number of confirmed cases and deaths to 58,198 and 1,106, respectively.

27 September – 126 cases and 2 deaths reported, bringing the total number of confirmed cases and deaths to 58,324 and 1,108, respectively.

28 September – 136 cases and 3 deaths reported, bringing the total number of confirmed cases and deaths to 58,460 and 1,111, respectively.

29 September – 187 cases no deaths reported, bringing the total number of confirmed cases to 58,647.

30 September – 201 cases and 1 death reported, bringing the total number of confirmed cases and deaths to 58,848 and 1,112, respectively.

October

1 October – 153 cases and no deaths reported, bringing the total number of confirmed cases to 59,001.

2 October – 126 cases and no deaths reported, bringing the total number of confirmed cases to 59,127.

3 October – 160 cases and 1 death reported, bringing the total number of confirmed cases and deaths to 59,287 and 1,113, respectively.

4 October – 58 cases and no deaths reported, bringing the total number of confirmed cases to 59,345.

5 October – 120 cases and no deaths reported, bringing the total number of confirmed cases to 59,465.

6 October – 118 cases and no deaths reported, bringing the total number of confirmed cases to 59,583.

7 October – 155 cases and no deaths reported, bringing the total number of confirmed cases to 59,738.

8 October – 103 cases and no deaths reported, bringing the total number of confirmed cases to 59,841.

9 October – 151 cases and no deaths reported, bringing the total number of confirmed cases to 59,992.

10 October – 111 cases and 2 deaths reported, bringing the total number of confirmed cases and deaths to 60,103 and 1,115, respectively.

11 October – 163 cases and no deaths reported, bringing the total number of confirmed cases to 60,266.

12 October – 164 cases and no deaths reported, bringing the total number of confirmed cases to 60,430.

13 October – 225 cases and 1 death reported, bringing the total number of confirmed cases and deaths to 60,655 and 1,116, respectively.

14 October – 179 cases and no deaths reported, bringing the total number of confirmed cases to 60,834.

15 October – 148 cases and no deaths reported, bringing the total number of confirmed cases to 60,932.

16 October – 212 cases and 3 deaths reported, bringing the total number of confirmed cases and deaths to 61,194 and 1,119, respectively.

17 October – 113 cases and 4 deaths reported, bringing the total number of confirmed cases and deaths to 61,307 and 1,123, respectively.

18 October – 133 cases and 2 deaths reported, bringing the total number of confirmed cases and deaths to 61,440 and 1,125, respectively.

19 October – 118 cases and no deaths reported, bringing the total number of confirmed cases to 61,558.

20 October – 72 cases and no deaths reported, bringing the total number of confirmed cases to 61,630.

21 October – 37 cases and no deaths reported, bringing the total number of confirmed cases to 61,667.

22 October – 138 cases and 2 deaths reported, bringing the total number of confirmed cases and deaths to 61,805 and 1,127, respectively.

23 October – 77 cases and 2 deaths reported, bringing the total number of confirmed cases and deaths to 61,882 and 1,129, respectively.

24 October – 48 cases and no deaths reported, bringing the total number of confirmed cases to 61,930.

25 October – 62 cases and 1 death reported, bringing the total number of confirmed cases and deaths to 61,992 and 1,130, respectively.

26 October – 119 cases and 2 deaths reported, bringing the total number of confirmed cases and deaths to 62,111 and 1,132, respectively.

27 October – 113 cases and 3 deaths reported, bringing the total number of confirmed cases and deaths to 62,224 and 1,135, respectively.

28 October – 147 cases and 4 deaths reported, bringing the total number of confirmed cases and deaths to 62,371 and 1,139, respectively.

29 October – 150 cases and 2 deaths reported, bringing the total number of confirmed cases and deaths to 62,521 and 1,141, respectively.

30 October – 170 cases and 3 deaths reported, bringing the total number of confirmed cases and deaths to 62,691 and 1,144, respectively.

31 October – 162 cases and no deaths reported. There were 4,005 new cases and 32 deaths in October, bringing the total number of cases from the start of the outbreak and the death toll to 62,853 and 1,144, respectively. There were 3,034 active cases at the end of the month. 

Model-based simulations indicate that the 95% confidence interval for the time-varying reproduction number R t was close to 1.0 in October.

November

1 November – 111 cases and 2 deaths reported, bringing the total number of confirmed cases and deaths to 62,964 and 1,146, respectively.

2 November – 72 cases and 1 death reported, bringing the total number of confirmed cases and deaths to 63,036 and 1,147, respectively.

3 November – 137 cases and 4 deaths reported, bringing the total number of confirmed cases and deaths to 63,173 and 1,151, respectively.

4 November – 155 cases and 4 deaths reported, bringing the total number of confirmed cases and deaths to 63,328 and 1,155, respectively.

5 November – 180 cases and no deaths reported, bringing the total number of confirmed cases to 63,508.

6 November – 223 cases and no deaths reported, bringing the total number of confirmed cases to 63,731.

7 November – 59 cases reported and 1 death denotified, bringing the total number of confirmed cases and deaths to 63,790 and 1,154 respectively.

8 November – 300 cases and no deaths reported, bringing the total number of confirmed cases to 64,090.

9 November – 94 cases and 4 deaths reported, bringing the total number of confirmed cases and deaths to 64,184 and 1,158, respectively.

10 November – 152 cases and 2 deaths reported, bringing the total number of confirmed cases and deaths to 64,336 and 1,160, respectively.

11 November – 180 cases and 2 deaths reported, bringing the total number of confirmed cases and deaths to 64,516 and 1,162, respectively.

12 November – 212 cases and no deaths reported, bringing the total number of confirmed cases to 64,728.

13 November – 156 cases and 1 death reported, bringing the total number of confirmed cases and deaths to 64,884 and 1,163, respectively.

14 November – 112 cases and no deaths reported, bringing the total number of confirmed cases to 64,996.

15 November – 152 cases and no deaths reported, bringing the total number of confirmed cases to 65,148.

16 November – 157 cases and no deaths reported, bringing the total number of confirmed cases to 65,305.

17 November – 152 cases and no deaths reported, bringing the total number of confirmed cases to 65,457.

18 November – 236 cases and no deaths reported, bringing the total number of confirmed cases to 65,693.

19 November – 146 cases and 2 deaths reported, bringing the total number of confirmed cases and deaths to 65,839 and 1,165, respectively.

20 November – 143 cases and no deaths reported, bringing the total number of confirmed cases to 65,982.

21 November – 246 cases and 1 death reported, bringing the total number of confirmed cases and deaths to 66,228 and 1,166, respectively.

22 November – 155 cases and 1 death reported, bringing the total number of confirmed cases and deaths to 66,383 and 1,167, respectively.

23 November – 56 cases and 1 death reported, bringing the total number of confirmed cases and deaths to 66,439 and 1,168, respectively.

24 November – 168 cases and 1 death reported, bringing the total number of confirmed cases and deaths to 66,607 and 1,169, respectively.

25 November – 198 cases and no deaths reported, bringing the total number of confirmed cases to 66,805.

26 November – 169 cases and no deaths reported, bringing the total number of confirmed cases to 66,974.

27 November – 246 cases and 2 deaths reported, bringing the total number of confirmed cases and deaths to 67,220 and 1,171, respectively.

28 November – 110 cases and 0 deaths reported, bringing the total number of confirmed cases and to 67,330.

29 November – 82 cases and 2 deaths reported, bringing the total number of confirmed cases and deaths to 67,412 and 1,173, respectively.

30 November – 145 cases and no deaths reported. There were 4,704 new cases in November, bringing the total number of cases to 67,557. The death toll rose to 1,173. There were 3,102 active cases at the end of the month.

December

1 December – 281 cases and 3 deaths reported, bringing the total number of confirmed cases and deaths 67,838 and 1,176, respectively.

2 December – 122 cases and 1 death reported, bringing the total number of confirmed cases and deaths to 67,960 and 1,177, respectively.

3 December – 343 cases and 2 deaths reported, bringing the total number of confirmed cases and deaths to 68,303 and 1,179, respectively.

4 December – 324 cases and no deaths reported, bringing the total number of confirmed cases to 68,627.

5 December – 310 cases and 1 death reported, bringing the total number of confirmed cases and deaths to 68,937 and 1,180, respectively.

6 December – 318 cases and no deaths reported, bringing the total number of confirmed cases to 69,255.

7 December – 390 cases and 1 death reported, bringing the total number of confirmed cases and deaths to 69,645 and 1,181, respectively.

8 December – 550 cases and 1 death reported, bringing the total number of confirmed cases and deaths to 70,195 and 1,182, respectively.

9 December – 474 cases and 2 deaths reported, bringing the total number of confirmed cases and deaths to 70,669 and 1,184, respectively.

10 December 
675 cases and 6 deaths reported, bringing the total number of confirmed cases and deaths to 71,344 and 1,190, respectively.
Dr. Osagie Ehanire, the Health Minister said that the second wave is imminent because of the rising number of cases; he added that the rise in cases was mostly driven by an increase in infections within communities and, to a lesser extent, travelers entering Nigeria.
Secretary to the Government of the Federation and chairman of the Presidential Task Force on COVID-19, Boss Mustapha said that the second wave of the pandemic has begun, following the increase in the number of COVID-19 cases detected in the country.

11 December – 796 cases and no deaths reported, bringing the total number of confirmed cases to 72,140.

12 December – 617 cases and 4 deaths reported, bringing the total number of confirmed cases and deaths to 72,757 and 1,194, respectively.

13 December – 418 cases and 3 deaths reported, bringing the total number of confirmed cases and deaths to 73,175 and 1,197, respectively.

14 December – 201 cases and no deaths reported, bringing the total number of confirmed cases to 73,374.

15 December – 758 cases and 3 deaths reported, bringing the total number of confirmed cases and deaths to 74,132 and 1,200, respectively.

16 December – 930 cases and no deaths reported, bringing the total number of confirmed cases to 75,062.

17 December – 1,145 cases and 1 death reported, bringing the total number of confirmed cases and deaths to 76,207 and 1,201, respectively.

18 December – 806 cases and 11 deaths reported, bringing the total number of confirmed cases and deaths to 77,013 and 1,212, respectively.

19 December – 920 cases and 6 deaths reported, bringing the total number of confirmed cases and deaths to 77,933 and 1,218, respectively.

20 December – 501 cases and 3 deaths reported, bringing the total number of confirmed cases and deaths to 78,434 and 1,221, respectively.

21 December – 356 cases and 6 deaths reported, bringing the total number of confirmed cases and deaths to 78,790 and 1,227, respectively.

22 December – 999 cases and 4 deaths reported, bringing the total number of confirmed cases and deaths to 79,789 and 1,231, respectively.

23 December – 1,133 cases and 5 deaths reported, bringing the total number of confirmed cases and deaths to 80,922 and 1,236, respectively.

24 December 
1,041 cases and 6 deaths reported, bringing the total number of confirmed cases and deaths to 81,963 and 1,242, respectively.
John Nkengasong, Director of the Africa Centres for Disease Control and Prevention (CDC) told an online news conference from Addis Ababa that another new coronavirus variant has been found in Nigeria. Nkengasong announced “It’s a separate lineage from the UK and the South African lineages.”

25 December – 712 cases and 4 deaths reported, bringing the total number of confirmed cases and deaths to 82,747 and 1,246, respectively.

26 December – 829 cases and 1 death reported, bringing the total number of confirmed cases and deaths to 83,576 and 1,247, respectively.

27 December – 838 cases and 7 deaths reported, bringing the total number of confirmed cases and deaths to 84,414 and 1,254, respectively.

28 December – 397 cases and 10 deaths reported, bringing the total number of confirmed cases and deaths to 84,811 and 1,264, respectively.

29 December – 749 cases and 3 deaths reported, bringing the total number of confirmed cases and deaths to 85,560 and 1,267, respectively.

30 December – 1,016 cases and 11 deaths reported, bringing the total number of confirmed cases and deaths to 86,576 and 1,278, respectively.

31 December – 1,031 cases and 11 deaths reported. There were 19,953 new cases in December, raising the total number of confirmed cases to 87,510. The death toll rose to 1,289. The number of recovered patients increased to 73,713, leaving 12,908 active cases at the end of the month.

See also
Timeline of the COVID-19 pandemic in Nigeria (February–June 2020)
Timeline of the COVID-19 pandemic in Nigeria (January–June 2021)

References

Coronavirus pandemic
Disease outbreaks in Nigeria
Timelines of the COVID-19 pandemic in Nigeria